Igor Hrabáč (born 18 November 1983 in Banská Bystrica) is a Slovak football defender who currently plays for the Slovak 2. liga club MŠK Rimavská Sobota.

References

External links
 at fcdac1904.com
 at fksokolov.cz

1983 births
Living people
Slovak footballers
Association football defenders
FK Dukla Banská Bystrica players
FK Baník Sokolov players
FC DAC 1904 Dunajská Streda players
AS Trenčín players
MŠK Rimavská Sobota players
AC Sparta Prague players
FC Baník Prievidza players
Slovak Super Liga players
Sportspeople from Banská Bystrica